Spirorchiidae is a family of digenetic trematodes. Infestation by these trematodes leads to the disease spirorchiidiosis. Spirorchiids are mainly parasites of turtles. It has been synonymised with Proparorchiidae Ward, 1921, Spirorchidae Stunkard, 1921, and Spirorchiidae MacCallum, 1921.

Genera
Amphiorchis Price, 1934
Baracktrema Roberts, Platt & Bullard in Roberts, Platt, Orélis-Ribeiro & Bullard, 2016
Cardiotrema Dwivedi, 1967
Carettacola Manter & Larson, 1950
Cheloneotrema Simha & Chattopadhyaya, 1980
Coeuritrema Mehra, 1933
Enterohaematotrema Mehra, 1940
Hapalorhynchus Stunkard, 1922
Hapalotrema Looss, 1899
Learedius Price, 1934
Monticellius Mehra, 1939
Neocaballerotrema Simha, 1977
Neospirorchis Price, 1934
Plasmiorchis Mehra, 1934
Platt Roberts & Bullard in Roberts, Arias, Halanych, Dang & Bullard, 2018
Satyanarayanotrema Simha & Chattopadhyaya, 1980
Shobanatrema Simha & Chattopadhyaya, 1980
Spirhapalum Ejsmont, 1927
Spirorchis MacCallum, 1919
Unicaecum Stunkard, 1925
Uterotrema Platt & Pichelin, 1994
Vasotrema Stunkard, 1928

Hosts 
Freshwater spirorchiids have been reported to infect the freshwater snails Helisoma trivolvis, Helisoma anceps, Physa sp., Menetus dilatatus, Ferrissia fragilis, Biomphalaria occide, Biomphalaria sudanica, Biomphalaria glabrata, Biomphalaria tenagophila, Pomacea sp. and Indoplanorbis exustus as intermediate hosts. Marine species have been reported to infect vermetid gastropods belonging to the genera Thylacodes, Thylaeodus, and Dendropoma, and terebellid polychaetes belonging to the genera Amphitrite and Enoplobranchus as intermediate hosts.

The cardiovascular parasites Learedius learedi, Hapalotrema postorchis, Monticellius indicum and Amphiorchis solus have been found in the green sea turtle (Chelonia mydas).

Spirhapalum siamensis is a parasite found in the heart of the Amboina box turtle (Cuora amboinensis).

References

Trematode families
Diplostomida